Women's basketball at the 2002 Asian Games was held in Geumjeong Gymnasium and Sajik Arena, Busan from October 3 to October 14, 2002.

Squads

Results
All times are Korea Standard Time (UTC+09:00)

Preliminary round

Final round

Semifinals

3/4 placing

Final

Final standing

References

Results

External links
Official website

women